Benralizumab, sold under the brand name Fasenra, is a monoclonal antibody medication which is developed by MedImmune for the treatment of asthma. It is directed against the alpha-chain of the interleukin-5 receptor (CD125).

Two phase III clinical trials of benralizumab reported meeting their primary endpoints in 2016. It was approved by the US Food and Drug Administration in November 2017 for the treatment of severe eosinophilic asthma. It was granted designation as an orphan drug by the Food and Drug Administration for treatment of eosinophilic oesophagitis in August 2019.

References

External links 
 

Antiasthmatic drugs
Monoclonal antibodies
AstraZeneca brands
Orphan drugs